is a fried tofu fritter made with vegetables, such as carrots, lotus roots and burdock. It may also contain egg. Ganmodoki means pseudo-goose ( + ). This is because ganmodoki is said to taste like goose; compare mock turtle soup. Ganmodoki is also called ganmo for short.

In the Edo period, ganmodoki was a stir-fried konjac dish. A dish similar to the ganmodoki today was made by wrapping chopped up vegetables in tofu (much like a manjū) and deep frying it.

In Western Japan, Ganmodoki is called hiryōzu, hiryuzu or hirōsu, from the Portuguese word filhós or Spanish fillos.

Gallery

See also
 Oden
 List of tofu dishes

References

External links

ganmodoki-or-hiryouzu-japanese-tofu-fritters

Japanese cuisine
Tofu dishes